Dante Eugenio Poli García (born 15 August 1976) is a Chilean football pundit and former player. He played as a defender.

Club career
Born in Arica, Poli began his career with Santiago-based club Universidad Católica, with whom he won the Chilean Primera División title in 1997 and 2002. He went on trial with Manchester United in July and August 1997, and played in three friendlies for the club, but was not signed on a permanent basis. In 2003, he left Chile for Argentine side Nueva Chicago, but shortly after finally moved to Europe to sign for Greek club Skoda Xanthi. However, he lasted only a season there before returning to Chile with Unión Española in 2004. He moved to the Puerto Rico Islanders in 2005, where he finished his career, retiring in 2006.

International career
He played for Chile in both the 1993 FIFA U17 World Championship in Japan, where Chile reached the third place, and the 1995 FIFA U20 Championship in Qatar. In addition, he took part of Chile squad in both the 1993 South American U17 Championship and the 1995 South American U20 Championship.

At senior level, in 1997 he made two appearances for Chile in both the friendly match against Jamaica and the 1997 Copa América match against Ecuador.

Post-retirement

Previously, he worked on the sports channels CDF and Fox Sports Chile.

Honours

Club
Universidad Católica
 Primera División de Chile (2): 1997 Apertura, 2002 Apertura
 Copa Chile (1): 1995

International
Chile U17
 FIFA U-17 World Cup third place: 1993

References

External links
 
 Dante Poli at playmakerstats.com (English version of ceroacero.es)

1976 births
Living people
People from Arica
Chilean people of Italian descent
Chilean footballers
Chilean expatriate footballers
Chile international footballers
Chile youth international footballers
Chile under-20 international footballers
Club Deportivo Universidad Católica footballers
Nueva Chicago footballers
Xanthi F.C. players
Unión Española footballers
Puerto Rico Islanders players
Chilean Primera División players
Argentine Primera División players
Super League Greece players
USL First Division players
Chilean expatriate sportspeople in Argentina
Chilean expatriate sportspeople in Greece
Chilean expatriate sportspeople in Puerto Rico
Chilean expatriate sportspeople in the United States
Expatriate footballers in Argentina
Expatriate footballers in Greece
Expatriate footballers in Puerto Rico
Expatriate soccer players in the United States
Association football defenders
1997 Copa América players
Chilean football managers
Chilean radio personalities
Chilean association football commentators
Canal del Fútbol color commentators